Creature with the Atom Brain (film), 1955 American zombie horror science fiction film
Creature with the Atom Brain (band), Belgian alternative rock band